Varkala Kahar is an Indian politician who was a member of 13th Kerala Legislative Assembly. He belongs to Indian National Congress party and represents Varkala constituency. He was previously elected to Kerala Legislative Assembly in 2001 and 2006. He lost in 2016 to a new Left Democratic Front candidate V. Joy, thus ending a 15-year old stint.

Political life
He started his political career as a student leader of Kerala Students Union. He was the college union speaker in S.N College, Varkala. He has served as the chairman of Kerala Head Load Workers' Welfare Fund Board. He is also the founder president of Thiruvananthapuram Head Load Workers' Union. He was a Haj Goodwill Delegate representing India.

Personal life
He was born on 12 December 1950 at Varkala in Thiruvananthapuram district. He is the son of Abdulla Musaliar and Shereefa Beevi. He is married to Shaheeda Kahar and has two children.

References 

Indian National Congress politicians from Kerala
1950 births
Living people
Kerala MLAs 2001–2006
Kerala MLAs 2006–2011
Kerala MLAs 2011–2016
People from Varkala